Rick Ravon Mears (born December 3, 1951) is a retired American race car driver. He is one of four men to win the Indianapolis 500 four times (1979, 1984, 1988, 1991) and is the current record-holder for pole positions in the race with six (1979, 1982, 1986, 1988, 1989, 1991). Mears is also a three-time Indycar series/World Series champion (1979, 1981 and 1982).

Biography

Early years
Mears was born  in Wichita, Kansas and raised in Bakersfield, California. He began his racing career in off-road racing. In 1976, he was recommended by a representative of Bill Simpson' helmet company, and Simpson gave him a ride at the USAC Champ Car's Ontario 500 on an old Eagle-Offenhauser, finishing 8th. Simpson then sold the car to Art Sugai, on condition that Mears would continue driving it. In mid 1977 he switched to Theodore Racing.

His speed attracted the attention of Roger Penske. Although at the time Penske Racing had the services of Mario Andretti and Tom Sneva, Andretti was also racing in Formula One with Lotus, and Penske wanted another young driver who would focus exclusively on American racing. For 1978, Mears was offered a part-time ride in nine of the 18 championship races, filling in when Andretti was overseas. The arrangement also included a ride at the Indianapolis 500.

In his rookie appearance at Indy, Mears qualified on the front row and was the first rookie to qualify over 200 mph. When the race began, Mears discovered his helmet was not strapped on tight enough and he had to pit to get it safely secured. He did not lead a lap and retired at 104 laps with a blown engine. He ended up sharing "Rookie of the Year" honors with Larry Rice. Two weeks later, at the Rex Mays 150, he won his first race. He added another win a month later at Atlanta and rounded off the year with his first road course win at Brands Hatch. Because of his terrific showing as a rookie, Mears was elevated to full-time status for 1979 after teammate and series champion Tom Sneva and Penske parted company.

1979
In 1979 the National Championship sanction changed from the USAC to CART. At Indianapolis he won his first "500", staying at the front of the field, taking advantage when Bobby Unser fell out of contention with mechanical trouble. Three wins and four second places in the eleven CART-eligible races won Mears his first championship. His worst finish in the season was seventh in Trenton's second heat.

1980
In 1980 the ground effect Chaparral was technologically more advanced than the other chassis, and Johnny Rutherford drove it to his 3rd Indianapolis 500 win, going on to dominate the season. Mears finished in fourth place in the points with one win, scored at Mexico City.

In 1980 Mears was offered a Formula One test with Brabham by then team boss Bernie Eccelstone. Mears took interest in the test largely because of the ongoing split between CART and USAC and wanted other options in case CART fell apart. Mears tested with Brabham twice, once at Paul Ricard and once at Riverside. After adjusting his driving style to the Brabham BT49 Mears posted lap times within half a second of future three time Formula One champion and then Brabham driver Nelson Piquet at the first test. During the second test Mears posted lap times faster than Piquet's.  Piquet was so impressed with Mears' driving and enjoyed their time spent together so much that he endorsed bringing Mears on as a second driver. Eccelstone offered Mears a contract with Brabham that Mears ultimately declined. Mears would later say in his memoir that although he felt that Brabham was a strong team and that he had the skill to compete for wins in Formula One he was unsure about moving to Europe and was still interested in oval racing as the main reasons for declining Eccelstone's offer.

1981–1982
The 1981 and 1982 seasons saw two more championships for Mears. Despite facial burns during a pit fire in the 1981 Indianapolis 500, Mears' ten race victories in the two-year span were enough for another two Indycar championship titles. At the 1982 Indianapolis 500 he came within 0.16 of a second of adding a second Indy win. With less than 20 laps to go, during Mears' final pit stop, the crew filled the entire tank rather than giving him only the amount he needed to finish. The delay left him more than 11 seconds behind Gordon Johncock. Mears made up the difference when Johncock suffered handling problems, but failed to secure the win. The photo finish stood for 10 years as the closest finish to an Indy 500. The photo-finish also muffled out the controversial pace-lap crash with teammate Kevin Cogan who appeared to have spun out for no apparent reason; fellow drivers such as Gordon Johncock, Johnny Rutherford, and Bobby Unser, charged Mears with causing the crash by bringing the field down at a slow pace.

1983–1984
For 1983 the Penske team acquired the Pennzoil sponsorship with its yellow paint scheme. Teammate Al Unser took that year's title. The team switched to the March chassis for the 1984 Indianapolis 500 after the Penske chassis proved unsuccessful in the first two races of the year. Mears scored his second Indy win that May but suffered severe leg injuries later in the year in a crash at Sanair Super Speedway. The March chassis, like most contemporary open-wheel racing cars, sat the driver far forward in the nose, with little protection for the legs and feet.

1985–1987
After the Sanair crash, Mears was slowed by the injuries to his right foot that affected him throughout the remainder of his career. Over the next three seasons, he won only two races. He completed a comeback from his injuries by winning the 1985 Pocono 500. In 1986, he won the pole position for the Indy 500, but finished only 3rd. He also won the 1987 Pocono 500.

1988–1990
In 1988, after several years using the March chassis, the Penske team utilized a new car, the PC-17, with a Chevrolet racing engine. Mears used the new car to win the Indy 500. A year later, he took a record-setting fifth pole position at Indy, but retired from the race with mechanical problems. Emerson Fittipaldi took the 500 and also beat Mears to the Championship in the last race at Laguna Seca Raceway, despite Mears winning that race. Also, that last race of 1989 set Mears apart from all other Indycar racers as he broke a tie with Bobby Rahal for race wins and became the most successful Indycar racer of the 1980s. In his winner's circle interview, when asked about breaking his road course dry spell when his specialty has been ovals through the years, he replied to Jack Arute, "Well, I guess there is hope for us old circle track drivers after all."

Fittipaldi joined Mears at Penske for 1990, but the year belonged to Al Unser Jr., who scored six wins. 1990 was Mears' last in the Pennzoil paint scheme as Marlboro took over as sponsor of the team, and Jim Hall re-entered Indycar.

1991–1992
In 1991 during a practice session Mears hit the wall at Indianapolis for the first time in his career. The next day, he climbed into his backup car and claimed his record 6th career pole position. Twenty laps from the end of the 500, it looked like Mears was set to be the runner-up behind Michael Andretti. However, when a subsequent yellow flag period erased Andretti's 15-second lead, Mears gained the lead as Andretti opted to pit for fuel. It was a short-lived lead, as Andretti passed Mears around the outside into the first turn. A lap later Mears regained the lead, using the same move Andretti had. Turning up his turbocharger, he then pulled away to win a fourth Indy 500, becoming the third driver to do so. In August 1991, at Michigan, he won his last race. At the 1992 Indy 500 Mears broke a wrist in a crash during practice and then crashed out of the race for the first time in his career as he could not avoid Jim Crawford's spinning car in turn 1. He raced only four more times in 1992 and then announced his retirement from racing at the Penske team's Christmas party. No one except Penske himself and Rick's wife, Chris, knew of his plans to retire. He had just turned 41 years old.

As of 2016, Rick Mears continues to work as a consultant and spotter for and Penske Racing, the team with which he won all of his Indycar races. He has acted a mentor for Penske drivers Helio Castroneves, Will Power, and Scott McLaughlin.

Personal life
Mears is the brother of Roger Mears, father of off-road and open-wheel racer Clint Mears, and the uncle of former NASCAR Cup Series driver Casey Mears. His marriage to his first wife Dina ended in divorce in 1983. He married Chris Bowen in 1986.

Awards
In 1997, he was inducted into the International Motorsports Hall of Fame.
Mears was inducted into the Indianapolis Motor Speedway Hall of Fame in 1998.
He was inducted in the Motorsports Hall of Fame of America in 1998.
Inducted into Team Penske Hall of Fame on May 25, 2017

Motorsports career results

American Open-Wheel racing

USAC

(key) (Races in bold indicate pole position)

CART Series

(key) (Races in bold indicate pole position)

Indianapolis 500 results

Indy 500 qualifying results

International Race of Champions
(key) (Bold – Pole position. * – Most laps led.)

Books

References

External links

 
 The Greatest 33

1951 births
Champ Car champions
Champ Car drivers
Indianapolis 500 drivers
Indianapolis 500 Rookies of the Year
Indianapolis 500 polesitters
Indianapolis 500 winners
International Motorsports Hall of Fame inductees
International Race of Champions drivers
Living people
Racing drivers from Bakersfield, California
Sportspeople from Wichita, Kansas
Racing drivers from Kansas
Team Penske drivers
USAC Gold Crown champions